God (stylised in all caps) were a British industrial band formed in London by Kevin Martin. The band's first official release was 'Sounds Like Thunder' in 1988, for a Mark E. Smith-curated 'Disparate Cognescenti' compilation. The band expanded to include nine members and released two studio albums before disbanding in 1996. The group's abrasive combination of ambient, dub, free jazz and noise rock music garnered respect from their peers such as Bill Laswell, Ministry, My Bloody Valentine, J. G. Thirlwell and John Zorn.

History 
God originally consisted of Kevin Martin on tenor saxophone and vocals and Nigel Armstrong on guitar. The pairing came together after the pair, along with Andy Rendall (Admass) relocated from Weymouth to London, and Fall frontman Mark E. Smith asked Martin if he wanted to contribute to Smith's 1988 Disparate Cognescenti compilation. In late 1988, Martin met Justin Broadrick, whose project Godflesh he had heard on John Peel's Radio 1 show. Broadrick began working with Martin and served as a producer for God's early releases before joining as a member.

Discography 
Studio albums
Possession (1992, Virgin)
The Anatomy of Addiction (1994, Big Cat)

Live albums
Loco (1991, Pathological)
Consumed (1993, Sentrax)

Singles and EPs
 Breach Birth (1990, Situation Two)
 Car First (1990, Clawfist) a split 7-inch with Terminal Cheesecake
 Appeal to Human Greed (1995, Big Cat)

References

External links
 
 

1987 establishments in England
British industrial music groups
British experimental musical groups
Musical groups established in 1987
Musical groups disestablished in 1996
Musical groups from London
Noise musical groups